Ain't Complaining is the eighteenth studio album by British rock band Status Quo. Initially released on the Vertigo label on 6 June 1988, it was the group's first album on that label to fall short of the UK Top 10, breaking a streak of 12 studio albums in the process. It reached no higher than its entry position of No. 12. The band, however, reentered the Top 10 just three years later with Rock 'Til You Drop in 1991.

Ain't Complaining spawned three singles: the title track, the ballad "Who Gets the Love?" and the only Top 10 hit among them, the jaunty "Burning Bridges", which partially incorporated the melody of the traditional folk song "Darby Kelly" within its distinctive instrumental breaks, without crediting it as such. John Edwards and Jeff Rich contributed compositions for the first time since joining Quo. "Another Shipwreck" had originally been a solo track by Andy Bown from his 1978 solo album Good Advice and was released as a single with him singing lead vocals. On Ain't Complaining, Rossi sings the song.

An unusual move by Status Quo on this album was the use and endorsement of Charvel guitars.

"The music was too polite," Rick Parfitt later remarked of the album. "There was no weight behind what we were doing. The edge had gone; we weren't real anymore."

Track listing
 "Ain't Complaining" (Rick Parfitt, Pip Williams) – 4:40
 "Everytime I Think of You" (John Edwards, Jeff Rich, Mike Paxman) – 3:49
 "One for the Money" (Rick Parfitt, Pip Williams) – 4:52
 "Another Shipwreck" (Andy Bown) – 3:48
 "Don't Mind If I Do" (Francis Rossi, John Edwards) – 4:41
 "I Know You're Leaving" (Eric van Tijn, Jochem Fluitsma) – 4:45
 "Cross That Bridge" (John David) – 3:31
 "Cream of the Crop" (Francis Rossi, Bernie Frost) – 4:03
 "The Loving Game" (Rick Parfitt, John Edwards, Jeff Rich) – 4:23
 "Who Gets the Love?" (Pip Williams, John Goodison) – 5:33
 "Burning Bridges" (Francis Rossi, Andy Bown) – 4:19
 "Magic" (Francis Rossi, Bernie Frost) – 3:52

2006 reissue bonus tracks

2018 Deluxe 3 CD Edition
Disc one matched the regular album tracklist.

Disc two
 "That's Alright" – B-Side – 12″ version of "Ain’t Complaining"
 "Lean Machine" – B-Side – 12″ version of "Ain’t Complaining"
 "Halloween" – B-Side – 12″ version of "Who Gets the Love?"
 "The Reason for Goodbye" – B-Side – 12″ version of "Who Gets the Love?"
 "The Greatest Fighter" – Outtake*
 "Running All Over the World" – Single
 "Ain’t Complaining" – Extended
 "Who Gets the Love" – Extended
 "Rockin All Over the World" – 1988 Re-recording
 "Burning Bridges" – Extended
 "Running All Over the World" – Extended
 "The Fighter" – Stand Up and Fight Remix – 4 Track Demo*
 "The Fighter" – Army Remix – 8 Track Demo*

Disc three (Live at Wembley, 07/07/1988; from BBC broadcast)
 "Whatever You Want"
 "Little Lady"
 "Roll Over Lay Down"
 "Cream of The Crop"
 "Who Gets the Love"
 "Hold You Back"
 "Don't Drive My Car"
 "Dirty Water"
 "In the Army Now"
 "Rockin' All Over the World"
 "Don't Waste My Time"
 "Bye Bye Johnny"

Personnel
Status Quo:
 Francis Rossi – vocals and lead guitar
 Rick Parfitt – vocals and guitar
 John Edwards – bass
 Andy Bown – keyboards
 Jeff Rich – drums

Additional personnel:
 Bernie Frost – additional vocals
 Paul "Wix" Wickens – additional keyboards
  – country violin on "Cross That Bridge" and "Burning Bridges"

Chart positions

Certifications

References

1988 albums
Status Quo (band) albums
Vertigo Records albums